Bryotropha vondermuhlli is a moth of the family Gelechiidae. It is found in Portugal, Spain and France.

The wingspan is 11–13 mm. The forewings are blackish brown, the base of the wing with distinct black costal and dorsal spots. The hindwings are pale grey, but slightly darker towards the apex. Adults have been recorded on wing from June to September.

References

Moths described in 2003
vondermuhlli
Moths of Europe